John Joseph Ramos (born August 6, 1965) is a former Major League Baseball catcher.

Ramos attended college at Stanford University. In 1985 he played collegiate summer baseball with the Cotuit Kettleers of the Cape Cod Baseball League and was named a league all-star. He was selected by the Yankees in the 5th round of the 1985 MLB Draft.

References

External links
 Baseball-Reference.com

1965 births
Living people
Major League Baseball catchers
New York Yankees players
Stanford Cardinal baseball players
Cotuit Kettleers players
Baseball players from Tampa, Florida
Albany-Colonie Yankees players
Columbus Clippers players
Fort Lauderdale Yankees players
Las Vegas Stars (baseball) players
Oneonta Yankees players
Prince William Yankees players
Syracuse Chiefs players
Henry B. Plant High School alumni